Alward is a surname, and may refer to:

 Aaron Alward (1828–1886), Canadian physician and political figure
 David Alward (born 1959), Canadian politician
 Herb Alward (1865–1897), American football player and coach
 Namaa Alward (born 1953), Iraqi actress and political activist 
 Roy Walter Alward (1877–1959), Canadian politician
 Peter Alward, Canadian philosopher
 Silas Alward (1841–1919), Canadian politician 
 Tom Alward (born 1952), American football player